The Chainman Shale is a geologic formation in Utah, mostly identical to the White Pine Shale. It preserves fossils dating back to the Carboniferous period.

See also

 List of fossiliferous stratigraphic units in Utah
 Paleontology in Utah

References

 

Geologic formations of Nevada
Geologic formations of Utah
Shale formations of the United States
Carboniferous geology of Nevada
Carboniferous geology of Utah
Carboniferous System of North America
Carboniferous southern paleotropical deposits